Jean-Philippe Levasseur (born January 15, 1987) is a Canadian former professional ice hockey goaltender.

Career 
Levasseur was selected by the Mighty Ducks of Anaheim in the seventh round (197th overall) of the 2005 NHL Entry Draft. During the 2010–11 AHL season he played for the Syracuse Crunch. He ended his career as a member of SG Cortina in Serie A, the top tier of professional ice hockey in Italy.

Awards and honours
U17 WHC Bronze Medal (2003–04)

References

External links

1987 births
Anaheim Ducks draft picks
Augusta Lynx players
Bakersfield Condors (1998–2015) players
Canadian ice hockey goaltenders
French Quebecers
Iowa Stars players
Laredo Bucks players
Living people
People from Victoriaville
Portland Pirates players
Rouyn-Noranda Huskies players
Springfield Falcons players
Syracuse Crunch players